Harry O'Boyle (October 31, 1904 – May 5, 1994) was an American football blocking back in the National Football League. He first was a member of the Green Bay Packers for two seasons, however he did not see any playing time during a regular season game during his second season. After two seasons away from the NFL, he re-joined the Packers for the 1933 NFL season. The following season, he played with the Philadelphia Eagles.

References

1904 births
1994 deaths
Players of American football from Des Moines, Iowa
Green Bay Packers players
Philadelphia Eagles players
American football quarterbacks
Notre Dame Fighting Irish football players